Jimeta is a town in Yola, Adamawa State, Nigeria. The town's population was 73,080 in 1991. The elevation of Jimeta is 135 m, and it lies along the Benue River.

Jimeta and nearby Yola, the state capital of Adamawa have interconnected histories, and, between 1935 and 1955, were unified as one town; Jimeta also serves as Yola's port  and it also contains Yola's airport. Some refer to the two as "Jimeta Yola."

References

Populated places in Adamawa State
Benue River